The People's Choice Awards is an American awards show, recognizing people in entertainment, voted online by the general public and fans. The show has been held annually since 1975, with the winners originally determined using Gallup Polls until a switch to online voting in 2005.

The awards were created by Bob Stivers, who produced the first show in 1975. The first awards recognized The Sting as Favorite Picture of 1974, Barbra Streisand as the year's Favorite Film Actress, and John Wayne as its Favorite Film Actor. So far, Ellen DeGeneres is the most awarded person, with a total of 20 awards.

In 1982, Stivers sold the People's Choice Awards to Procter & Gamble Productions (P&G); under P&G, the ceremony was broadcast by CBS, and Procter & Gamble's brands held exclusive national advertising time across the entire telecast.

In April 2017, the E! network announced that they had acquired the People's Choice Awards. The ceremony was shifted from its previous January scheduling to November, to reduce its proximity to the busier months of awards season. Since 2021, the ceremony has aired on E!'s sister broadcast network NBC. In March 2023, NBC announced that it would premiere a country music awards show—the People's Choice Country Awards—as a spin-off event; it will be held in September at the Ryman Auditorium in Nashville.

Categories
The award categories have varied over the years. For example, the 16th People's Choice Awards had categories including Favorite All-Around Movie (Batman), and both a Favorite Movie Actor (Tom Cruise) and a World Favorite Movie Actor (Dustin Hoffman). At the 23rd People's Choice Awards, Rob Reiner was named the People's Choice Awards Honoree. The 32nd People's Choice Awards (broadcast in January 2006) included categories such as Favorite On-Screen Match-Up (Vince Vaughn and Owen Wilson in Wedding Crashers), Favorite Leading Lady (Reese Witherspoon), Favorite Tour (U2), and an award named after a Procter & Gamble brand: Nice 'n Easy Fans Favorite Hair (Faith Hill). In 2008, the People's Choice Awards introduced a new category: Favorite Sci-Fi Show. The nominees were Stargate Atlantis, Battlestar Galactica, and Doctor Who. Stargate Atlantis was the first recipient of the award.

Poll-based awards
In the 20th century, the awards were based on results from Gallup polls. Each year, Gallup took a survey of different categories for favorite actor, actress, movie, artist, television program or group. The scope was unlimited—the public could choose whomever or whatever it liked. The results of the annual survey were announced in the form of the People's Choice Awards. Since polls have margins of error, many years' awards have had ties in at least one category, when Gallup declared that the voting was so close that a single winner could not be chosen. For instance, in 2003, both Spider-Man and The Lord of the Rings: The Fellowship of the Ring were recognized as Favorite Motion Picture.

Switch to online voting
The winners of the 31st People's Choice Awards (on January 9, 2005) were decided by online voting rather than Gallup polls. The nominees submitted for Internet voting were selected using an unpublished process involving editors at Entertainment Weekly, the show's production team and a panel of pop culture fans.

The nominees for the 32nd People's Choice Awards were determined by the web research company Knowledge Networks, which took a nationally representative sample of men and women ages 18 to 54, with and without Internet access, to come up with the nominees. After being presented with a list of candidates determined by national ratings averages, box office grosses and album sales, they had the option to write in their favorites. Knowledge Networks recruits its panel by using a RDD phone recruitment method and provides a web TV and Internet access to households without Internet access enabling them to infer back to the entire population.

The nominees for the 2010 People's Choice Awards were determined by the media research company Visible Measures, which specializes in measuring Internet video audience behavior. The announcement of this partnership stated, "For the first time ever, the People's Choice Awards has incorporated Internet video viewing data into the initial nominee selection process, depending on Visible Measures True Reach metrics to objectively measure online video popularity. [...] Visible Measures worked with the People's Choice Awards to determine each potential nominees' popularity on a True Reach basis, a unique measure of the total audience that has been exposed to an online video campaign – regardless of how widely the campaign spreads or where it appears. To measure True Reach, Visible Measures deploys a robust and patented set of technologies with the goal of capturing the universe of Internet video viewership data in near real-time."

Former categories
These are some of the past categories for the People's Choice Awards:

Movies
 Favorite Movies
 Favorite Movie Actor
 Favorite Movie Actress
 Favorite Action Movie
 Favorite Action Actor
 Favorite Action Actress
 Favorite Animated Movie
 Favorite Animated Movie Voice
 Favorite Cast
 Favorite Comedy Movie
 Favorite Comedic Movie Actor
 Favorite Comedic Movie Actress
 Favorite Dramatic Movie
 Favorite Dramatic Movie Actor
 Favorite Dramatic Movie Actress
 Favorite Family Movie
 Favorite Horror Movie
 Favorite Thriller Movie
 Favorite Sci-Fi/Fantasy Movie
 Favorite Movie Icon

Digital
 Favorite Comedic Collaboration
 Favorite Social Media Celebrity
 Favorite Social Media Star
 Favorite Mobile Game
 Favorite Video Game
 Favorite YouTube Star
 CBS.com's Favorite Digital Obsession

Television
 Favorite TV Show
 Favorite Network TV Comedy
 Favorite Comedy TV Actor
 Favorite Comedy TV Actress
 Favorite Network TV Drama
 Favorite Dramatic TV Actor
 Favorite Dramatic TV Actress
 Favorite Cable TV Comedy
 Favorite Cable TV Drama
 Favorite Cable TV Actor
 Favorite Cable TV Actress
 Favorite Premium Cable TV Show
 Favorite Premium Cable TV Actor
 Favorite Premium Cable TV Actress
 Favorite TV Crime Drama
 Favorite Horror Show
 Favorite Crime Drama TV Actor
 Favorite Crime Drama TV Actress
 Favorite Network Sci-Fi/Fantasy Show
 Favorite Cable Sci-Fri/Fantasy Show
 Favorite Sci-Fi/Fantasy Actor
 Favorite Sci-Fi/Fantasy Actress
 Favorite Competition TV Show
 Favorite Daytime TV Host
 Favorite Daytime TV Hosting Team
 Favorite Late Night Talk Show Host
 Favorite Streaming Series
 Favorite TV Bromance
 Favorite Actor in a New TV Series
 Favorite Actress in a New TV Series
 Favorite Animated TV Show
 Favorite New TV Comedy
 Favorite New TV Drama

Current categories
The first ceremony in 1975 had 14 categories. In 2016, 74 categories were established.

As of 2018, these are the current categories:

Movies
 Movie of the Year
 Comedy Movie of the Year
 Action Movie of the Year
 Drama Movie of the Year
 Drama Movie Stars of the Year
 Male Movie Star of the Year
 Female Movie Star of the Year
 Comedy Movie Star of the Year
 Action Movie Star of the Year

Pop culture
 Social Star of the Year
 Beauty Influencer of the Year
 Social Celebrity of the Year
 Animal Star of the Year
 Comedy Act of the Year
 Style Star of the Year
 Game Changer of the Year
 Pop Podcast of the Year
 Video Game of the Year
 Athlete of the Year

Television
 Drama Show of the Year
 Comedy Show of the Year
 Revival Show of the Year
 Reality Show of the Year
 Competition Show of the Year
 Male TV Star of the Year
 Female TV Star of the Year
 Drama TV Star of the Year
 Comedy TV Star of the Year
 Daytime Talk Show of the Year
 Nighttime Talk Show of the Year
 Competition Contestant of the Year
 Reality TV Star of the Year
 Bingeworthy Show of the Year
 Sci-Fi/Fantasy Show of the Year

Music
 Male Artist of the Year
 Female Artist of the Year
 Group of the Year
 Song of the Year
 Album of the Year
 Country Artist of the Year
 Latin Artist of the Year
 Music Video of the Year
 Concert Tour of the Year

Special awards

People's Voice
 2013: Christina Aguilera

People's Icon
 2018: Melissa McCarthy
 2019: Jennifer Aniston
 2020: Jennifer Lopez
 2021: Halle Berry
 2022: Ryan Reynolds

People's Music Icon
 2021: Christina Aguilera
 2022: Shania Twain

Ceremonies

See also
 People's Choice Awards Australia
 People's Choice Awards India
 People's Choice Podcast Awards

References

External links

 
 "People's Choice Awards: You showed up? Here's a trophy!" from Entertainment Weekly
 A 35th Anniversary article from The Hollywood Reporter

 
American annual television specials
American film awards
American music awards
American television awards
Awards established in 1975
Procter & Gamble
E!
1975 establishments in the United States